is a video game character created by SNK. Ralf has made appearance in several games from the company, premiering in TNK III as a military tank driver. The Ikari Warriors series also emphasized Ralf's role as a soldier with him becoming the partner of Clark Still. Both Ralf and Clark would also become recurring characters in The King of Fighters fighting games series in which they appear as part of the Ikari Team participating in various tournaments also while searching for various criminals. Additionally, Ralf and Clark have appeared in few games from the Metal Slug series, also developed by SNK. 

Since his appearance in Ikari Warriors Ralf was meant to be a soldier, and the SNK staff were highly inspired by the film series, Rambo. With the start of The King of Fighters, developers were focused in redesigning Ralf's character so that he would be very different from Clark, whom he shared several similarities. Ralf has been highly popular with gamers, having appeared in several popularity polls from journals. His character has also received comments from various video games publications, which praised his attributes and development in the various games he has appeared.

Creation and conception
Developers from Ikari Warriors were highly inspired by the film series, Rambo, when designing the game and Ralf and Clark. According to Keiko Iju, a former creator from SNK games, he needed to create "half-naked Rambos" as characters. Initially, The King of Fighters was only meant to feature characters from the Art of Fighting series and the Fatal Fury series. However, they later decided to add characters from the Ikari Warriors series along with ones from Psycho Soldier in spirit of other gaming genres considered for the final product. Designers from The King of Fighters series found problems with the addition of Ralf and Clark to the game as they were very similar. As such, the designers added new details to both characters in order to make them more distinguishable. While Clark received sunglasses, Ralf was given as bandana. However, developers also found their fighting styles to be very similar, causing designer to adjust both of them until becoming totally different. In the making of The King of Fighters '94, Ralf was originally meant to appear shirtless. However, during the designing phase, developers felt his appearance was "a bit dated" and changed once again his outfit. In comparison to all the other characters from the game, Ralf was going to have grenades as part of his moveset, but the staff found that would be unfair for the other characters so he lost such ability. By The King of Fighters XII, Ralf's appearance was changed once again to his Ikari Warriors outfit as developers wanted to "stay true to the original concept" from The King of Fighters series.

Character design
In Ikari Warriors, Ralf's attire was based on Rambo. He wore green pants, a red headband and a belt full of bullets. In the first game from The King of Fighters series, he wore jeans and a white sleeveless T-shirt, along with a military vest and a red bandanna. In The King of Fighters '99 is sightly changed with green jeans, black shirt, red gloves and with a pattern of green slashes added to his bandanna; also, he did not wear the belt. In The King of Fighters 2000, his outfit is once again modified but with darker colors from all his clothes. His attire from Ikari appears as alternate outfit for the character in the first Maximum Impact game. In KOF: Maximum Impact 2, Ralf retains his 2003 outfit but with a red jacket. His Armored Ralf version from the same game is very different from the original Ralf, as his skin is darker and his hair is lighter. He additionally sports a green jacket, military pants, a white T-shirt and a green headband instead of his red bandana. He was also given green protectors in his hands which have spikes. The additional outfits from the common Ralf are cosplays from Marco Rossi from the Metal Slug series and Jack Turner from the Art of Fighting series. In The King of Fighters XII, Ralf becomes bulkier and wears a dark olive military vest over a pair of dark olive cargo pants. His attire in The King of Fighters XIV is a mix of his '99 and XII outfits, with a white tank top and green camouflage cargo pants. His body also sports light green war paint in this.

Attributes
Ralf is a hot-blooded person that only cares for action. He is also informal when talking with his partners or his commander Heidern although he tends to start talking in a more formal way. However, he is very determined to accomplish all his missions, normally becoming very sad when he fails, especially when he loses a war. Despite being the counterpart of Clark in many ways, they are always assigned to work together. He is especially protective of any new recruits that come under his command and will try his best to care for them, most notably with Whip.

In KOF '94, Ralf and Clark shared the same set of Special Moves, with only their Super Special Move being different. His original Special Moves included the Vulcan Punch (a rapid punch attack with fire effects), the Gatling Attack (a rushing series of punches), and the Super Argentine Back Breaker (in which Ralf tosses his opponent in the air and catches him). In KOF '97, he gains the Ralf Kick, and in KOF '99 the Ralf Tackle. In KOF 2003, he loses the Ralf Tackle, but gains the Stealth Ralf Kick and the Unblock. His Super Special Move in KOF '94, is the Super Vulcan Punch, a more powerful version of the Vulcan Punch, while in KOF '96 he gains the Bareback Vulcan Punch, a version of the Super Vulcan Punch in which Ralf pins his opponent into the ground and unleashes a flurry of punches. In KOF '97, he gains the Galactica Phantom, a single but powerful punch which sends the enemy flying across the screen. In KOF 2002, he uses the Bareback Galactica Phantom as MAX2 move (a maximum level Super Special move), with an additional follow up gained in 2002 Unlimited Match which, at times, can lead to an instant kill. In KOF XIII, he gets the Jet Vulcan, a variant of the Super Vulcan Punch in which Ralf turns red with rage and unleashes a flurry of punches in front of him. In KOF XIV, he get the Ralf Super Phalanx, a combination of the Jet Vulcan and Galactica Phantom where Ralf unleashes eight punches in front of him which, if the last punch hits, will make his opponent stagger, allowing Ralf to finish off his opponent with a highly explosive straight.

Appearances 

Ralf Jones originally appeared in SNK's 1985 arcade game TNK III (known as TANK in Japan). In this game, the player did not take control of Ralf himself, but rather control the tank driven by Ralf, which is sent to an enemy base to destroy a secret weapon. A sequel was released for the Nintendo Entertainment System titled Iron Tank (Great Tank in Japan), which establishes the setting as World War II Normandy.

Ralf's next appearance was in action shooting game Ikari Warriors, released a year after TNK III. Instead of driving a tank, Ralf now fought his way into the enemy's lair on his own, along with his new partner Clark Still (the Player 2 character in the game) in order to protect the Ikari village.  Ikari Warriors was followed by two sequels: Victory Road (also known as Ikari Warriors II) and Ikari III: The Rescue), with the third involving Ralf and Clark into rescuing a presidential candidate's child from terrorists. In the international versions of the Ikari series for the NES and in Iron Tank, Ralf was renamed Paul.

Ralf and Clark would resurface as members of the Ikari Team in The King of Fighters fighting games series, along with their mentor and commanding officer Heidern. The team would be featured as a group of mercenaries who enter the annual King of Fighters tournaments to investigate a possible controversy made by several criminals, such as Rugal Bernstein and the NESTS cartel. Although the Ikari Team has undergone slight roster changes as the series progressed such as the retirement of Heidern, who returned in only with them in The King of Fighters 2001, replaced by his adoptive daughter Leona in The King of Fighters '96 (appearing in all the following games except The King of Fighters XI) as well as the introduction Whip in The King of Fighters '99, Ralf and Clark are two of the few characters who have remained constant, appearing in every game in the series. He also appears in The King of Fighters XII, which does not feature official teams (however his teammates from the 1996 tournament are all present and in the sequel, Ralf does team with Leona and Clark to form KOF XIII's Ikari team). Ralf has also appeared in the 3D game KOF: Maximum Impact and its sequel. Maximum Impact 2 also features , an enhanced version from his character with a stronger defense. However, this character was removed from the update version, KOF: Maximum Impact Regulation "A". Other games from the series featuring Ralf are The King of Fighters Neowave and The King of Fighters: Kyo; he appears in both of them with the Ikari Team having Leona as the third member.

Outside the KOF series, Ralf and Clark have also appeared as playable characters in Metal Slug 6, as well as Metal Slug 7, where he appears in his outfit from The King of Fighters 2000 and uses his Vulcan Punch as his special ability in the game. Also, he is the only character in the game capable of taking more than one hit before losing a life.

Ralf was also featured in the 2006 original net animation The King of Fighters: Another Day. He appears in the episodes three and four, searching for a clone from Kyo Kusanagi (created by NESTS) along with the Ikari Team in the fictional city of Southtown. 

Ralf featured as a cameo in Super Smash Bros. Ultimate as a background character in the King of Fighters Stadium stage and he also has a Spirit shared with Clark Still as well.

Reception
Gamers have well-received Ralf's character as he was voted as the staff's 12th favorite character in Gamest'''s 1997 Heroes Collection. In the character popularity poll on Neo Geo Freak's website, he was voted as the eighth favorite character with a total of 1,038 votes. In the January 30, 1995 issue of Gamest magazine in Japan, Ralf ranked at No. 19 in Top 50 Characters of 1994.

His character has received various positive reviews from video games publications. Jeff Gerstmann from GameSpot commented on Ralf to be a "Rambo-like" character in the Ikari Warriors game and also liked all the abilities the character had. 1UP.com found Ralf along with Clark's "Cross Changer!" pose as the most entertaining pose appearing in The King of Fighters '97 and '98, labelling as Sentai (since the pose is a homage to the transformation sequences in Chōjin Sentai Jetman). The Ralf's enhanced version from KOF: Maximum Impact 2, Armored Ralf, has proven very unpopular among gamers as commented by Nate Ahearn from IGN. As such, he notes his removal from KOF: Maximum Impact Regulation "A" was made due to this, and desire to add new characters to this game. Cinemablend.com writer William Usher liked Ralf's introduction in Metal Slug 6 as he still had his movesets from The King of Fighters series as it is well balanced with the gameplay from the Metal Slug series. Additionally, he found this moveset added more variety to the game. Wesley Yin-Poole from videogamer.com agreed on this, noting that each character from Metal Slug 7 had their own strengths and weakness, with Ralf being focused on close combats. Ryan Davis from GameSpot shared the comment and also praised Ralf and Clark's introduction in Metal Slug 6 was one of the best improvements from the series. Den of Geek listed Ralf as the 10th best The King of Fighters'' character praising most of his techniques. Venture Beat listed Armored Ralf as part of their "Hall of Lame" due to how overpowered this version of Ralf's character is.

References

Ansatsuken
Fictional American people in video games
Fictional MCMAP practitioners
Fictional mercenaries in video games
Fictional soldiers in video games
Fictional colonels
Male characters in video games
SNK protagonists
The King of Fighters characters
Video game characters introduced in 1985